Escort in Love ("Nobody can judge me") is a 2011 Italian comedy film directed by Massimiliano Bruno. Paola Cortellesi won the 2011 David di Donatello for Best Actress for her performance as Alice.

Plot
A wealthy woman, named Alice, lives in a luxurious house in Rome together with her husband and her 9-year-old son. She's superficial and materialistic, and treats her houseworkers very badly. Her world changes after her husband passes away in a motorbike accident, leaving Alice deeply in debt. She is forced to sell her house, and moves in the periphery with her son thanks to the advice of her old houseworker Aziz. 

However, the money she got from the house still isn't enough to repay her debt; so she contacts an escort named Eva, whom she had previously met at a party, in order to learn how to be an escort and earn a lot of money quickly. She soon develops a relationship with a man named Giulio, owner of an internet point, and she has to keep her real job a secret.

Cast
Anna Foglietta as Eva
Awa Ly as Abeba
Caterina Guzzanti as Sofia
Dario Cassini as Pietro
Fausto Leali as himself
Giovanni Bruno as Filippo
Hassani Shapi as Aziz
Lucia Ocone as Tiziana
Massimiliano Bruno as Francesco Graziani
Paola Cortellesi as Alice
Pasquale Petrolo as Enzo (as Lillo)
Raoul Bova as Giulio
Raul Bolanos as Marcelo
Riccardo Rossi as Journalist
Rocco Papaleo as Lionello Frustace
Valerio Aprea as Biagio
Valerio Mastandrea as Client of Eva / Narrator

See also
List of Italian films of 2011

References

External links

2011 comedy films
2011 films
Italian comedy films
2010s Italian-language films
Films about prostitution in Italy
Films directed by Massimiliano Bruno
Films set in Rome
Films shot in Rome
2010s Italian films